The Johann-Friedrich-von-Cotta-Literatur- und Übersetzerpreis der Landeshauptstadt Stuttgart is a literary prize awarded in Baden-Württemberg, Germany, awarded every three years to writers and translators. The prize is endowed with €20,000.

Winners
2005
Writer: Petra Morsbach
Translator: Michael Walter
2008
Writer: Egon Schwarz
Translator: Hartmut Köhler
2011
Writer: Günter Herburger
Translator: Claudia Ott
 2014
 Writer: Ulrike Edschmid
 Translator: Joachim Kalka
 2017
 Writer: Peter Stamm
 Translator: Petra Strien
 2020
 Writer: Thomas Stangl
 Translator: Claudia Steinitz

Literaturpreis der Stadt Stuttgart
From 1978 to 2002 this prize was known as City of Stuttgart Literary Prize. 

1978
Writer: Werner Dürrson
Writer: Roland Lang
Translator: Fritz Vogelgsang
1980
Writer: Irmela Brender
Writer: Margarete Hannsmann
Translator: Otto Bayer
1982
Writer: Friederike Roth
Writer: Franz Mechsner
Translator: Ragni Maria Seidl-Gschwend
1984
Writer: Otto Jägersberg
Writer: Jochen Kelter
Translator: Hans Hermann
1986
Writer: Walter Helmut Fritz
Writer: Christoph Lippelt
Translator: Elke Weh
1988
Writer: Ludwig Greve
Writer: Hanns-Josef Ortheil
Translator: Maria Csollán
1990
Writer: Zsuzsanna Gahse
Writer: Johannes Poethen
Translator: Rosemarie Tietze
1992
Writer: Tina Stroheker
Writer: Rolf Vollmann
Translator: Helga Pfetsch
1994
Writer: Albrecht Goes
Writer: Reinhard Gröper
Translator: Barbara Henninges
1996
Writer: Maria Beig
Translator: Willi Zurbrüggen
1998
Writer: Hermann Kinder
Translator: Hildegard Grosche
2000
Writer: Peter O. Chotjewitz
Translator: Nikolaus Stingl
2002
Writer: Jürgen Lodemann
Translator: Ralph Dutli

External links
Webseite der Stadt Stuttgart zum Johann Friedrich von Cotta-Preis 

Translation awards
Literary awards of Baden-Württemberg
Stuttgart